Gudex is a surname. Notable people with the surname include:

Niki Gudex, Australian mountain biker
Rick Gudex (1968–2016), American politician